Scheidel is a surname. Notable people with the surname include:

Walter Scheidel (born 1966), Austrian historian 
Wolfgang Scheidel (born 1943), German luger 
Valentin Scheidel (1883–?), German physicist 

German-language surnames
Occupational surnames